Order 66 may refer to:

 Order 66 (Star Wars), a fictional prearranged military command given by Palpatine during the movie Star Wars Episode III: Revenge of the Sith
 Star Wars Republic Commando: Order 66, the fourth novel in the Republic Commando series, written by Karen Traviss
 Order 66/2523, a 1980 anti-communist directive of the Thai government
 Standing Order 66, a 1713 British Parliamentary procedure
 Executive Order 9066, an executive order ordering the internment of Japanese Americans during World War II.